Diego de Souza Xavier (born 16 January 1993), known as Diego Souza, is a Brazilian footballer who plays for Treze as an attacking midfielder.

Club career
Born in Bariri, São Paulo, Diego Souza joined Palmeiras' youth setup in 2010, aged 17, after starting it out at São Paulo.

On 25 November 2012 Diego Souza made his first team – and Série A – debut for the former, coming on as a second-half substitute for Patrick Vieira in a 1–2 home loss against Atlético Goianiense. After appearing in only one further match during the year, he was loaned to Oeste on 25 July 2013.

Diego Souza returned to Verdão on 3 January 2014, but was subsequently loaned to União Barbarense, Paulista, Portuguesa, Ferroviária and Juventude.

In December 2018, after a period out of the game due to a cruciate ligament injury, he signed for Noroeste. He moved to Comercial for the 2020 Copa Paulista, but again suffered a knee injury and missed the first half of the 2021 season.

In January 2022 he signed for Treze.

References

External links
Diego Souza at playmakerstats.com (English version of ogol.com.br)

1993 births
Living people
Footballers from São Paulo (state)
Brazilian footballers
Association football midfielders
Campeonato Brasileiro Série A players
Campeonato Brasileiro Série B players
Campeonato Brasileiro Série C players
Sociedade Esportiva Palmeiras players
Oeste Futebol Clube players
União Agrícola Barbarense Futebol Clube players
Paulista Futebol Clube players
Associação Portuguesa de Desportos players
Esporte Clube Noroeste players
Esporte Clube Juventude players
Esporte Clube Comercial (MS) players
Treze Futebol Clube players
People from Bariri